Phillip Bruce Thompson,  (born 7 May 1988) is an Australian politician. His party is the Liberal National Party of Queensland and he sits with the Liberal Party in federal parliament.

He is a member of the House of Representatives, representing the Division of Herbert. He was first elected in the 2019 Australian federal election.

Prior to entering politics, Thompson was Queensland Young Australian of the Year.

Early life and education
Thompson was born in Armidale, New South Wales. In 2006, at age seventeen, Thompson enlisted in the Australian Army. He underwent training at Kapooka and Singleton before being posted to the 1st Battalion, Royal Australian Regiment, in Townsville. In 2007 Thompson was deployed to East Timor. 

In May 2009 Thompson was deployed to Afghanistan. Six months into this deployment, while conducting a dismounted patrol, an IED exploded a metre in front of him. He spent several years recovering from physical and mental injuries caused by the incident. The injuries at the time significantly affected his memory, hearing, and contributed to subsequent mental health challenges.

In 2014 Thompson represented Australia at the inaugural Invictus Games held in London; a sporting competition for wounded, injured, or ill participants in the armed forces. In 2016 he coached the Powerlifting and wheelchair rugby teams at the event held in Orlando, Florida. He was awarded a Medal of the Order of Australia in the 2018 Queen's Birthday Honours for service to the welfare of veterans.

Political career
Thompson entered politics upon being elected for the Division of Herbert at the 2019 federal election. He is the youngest member of the lower house in the 46th Parliament.

In Thompson's first speech he stated that the well-being of Indigenous Australians and the defence community are among his priorities as an MP. He acknowledged his mother in law, his wife, and daughter as Aboriginal women and stated that "we must not forget there must not forget there is still a lot of work to be done in recognising and valuing our First Nations people and their culture." Speaking of the defence community, Thompson acknowledged "the ultimate sacrifice on operations in service to this nation and our many veterans who have succumbed to their war within back here on home soil".

Thompson served on the "Inquiry into the destruction of 46,000 year old caves at the Juukan Gorge in the Pilbara region of Western Australia", which delivered its interim report in December 2020.

Thompson is a member of the National Right faction of the Liberal Party.

Personal life
Thompson is married to Jenna, and has two daughters named Astin and Emery.

Controversies
During his campaign, he apologised to the Muslim community after directing violent threats towards Muslims on Facebook in 2012.

References

1988 births
21st-century Australian politicians
Australian Army soldiers
Australian military personnel of the War in Afghanistan (2001–2021)
Liberal Party of Australia members of the Parliament of Australia
Living people
Members of the Australian House of Representatives for Herbert 	
Recipients of the Medal of the Order of Australia